Karuna Vee Beyvafa is a 2009 Maldivian drama film directed by Ali Seezan. Produced by Hassan Nooraddheen under C-Xanal Movies, the film stars Niuma Mohamed, Ali Seezan and Nadhiya Hassan in pivotal roles.

Plotline
A happily married couple, Shimla Ali (Niuma Mohamed) and Imran Mohamed (Ali Seezan) deal with the unfortunate news of Shimla's infertility. She suggests Imran to marry another woman to fulfill his father's dream of having a grand-child. Imran storms off with anger and assured he will not marry anyone else. Desperately, Shimla begged her best-friend, Fathimath Rishmy (Nadhiya Hassan) to enter Imran's life as his second wife which she declined. However, as a favor for a friend in need, Rishmy later agreed to move on with the plan while keeping their friendship as a secret.

Cast 
 Niuma Mohamed as Shimla Ali
 Ali Seezan as Imran Mohamed
 Nadhiya Hassan as Fathimath Rishmy
 Koyya Hassan Manik as Ibrahim Mohamed
 Arifa Ibrahim as Kuda Manike; Rishmy's step-mother
 Fauziyya Hassan as Faathuma
 Nasmee as Aisha

Soundtrack

References

2009 films
Maldivian drama films
Films directed by Ali Seezan
2009 drama films
Dhivehi-language films